Oman participated in the 16th Asian Games in Guangzhou, China from 12 November to 27 November 2010. Its contingent comprised 95 members, including 75 athletes. It will take part in six disciplines namely athletics, football, field hockey, shooting, tennis, and beach volleyball.

Medalists

Athletics

Football

Oman was in Group F with Pakistan, Thailand and Maldives.

Group F

Field hockey

Oman is placed in Group A along with Malaysia, South Korea, China and Singapore.

Team
 Abduljabbar al Balushi (goalkeeper)
 Asim Dawood al Hasni (goalkeeper)
 Hussain Abdullah al Hasni, 
 Mohammed Hubeis al Shar, 
 Basim Khatir Rajab Said, 
 Sameer Huleis al Shibli, 
 Younis Ghabish al Nofli
 Hussain Ali Mubarak
 Salah Nasser al Saadi
 Ikram Juman Ramadhan
 Shakir Awadh Said
 Hashim Ghanim al Shatri
 Waleed Abdullah al Hasani
 Yousuf Khalfan al Riyami
 Marwan Abdulrahman 
 Murshid Rabe’ea Said Huwait

Shooting

Tennis

References

Nations at the 2010 Asian Games
2010
Asian Games